Maria Amélia Gomes Barros da Lomba do Amaral, known as Amélia Da Lomba or Amélia Dalomba (born 23 November 1961 in Cabinda) is an Angolan writer and journalist.  She also served as Secretary of the Missão Internacionalista Angolana.  Da Lomba was awarded a presidential medal from Cape Verde in 2005.

Schooling
Da Lomba graduated with a degree in Psychology from a Moscow university.  A journalist, she worked for the Emissora Provincial de Cabinda, the Rádio Nacional de Angola, and the Jornal de Angola in Luanda.

Writing and music career
According to Luís Kandjimbo, Da Lomba belongs to a group of contemporary female writers in Angola such as Ana Paula Tavares, Ana Santana and Lisa Castel, which he refers to as the "Generation of Uncertainties" ("Geração das Incertezas")—writers who typically display anguish and melancholy in their works, expressing disappointment with the political and social conditions in the country.  Her works include Ânsia (1995), Sacrossanto Refúgio (c.1995) and Noites ditas à chuva (Nights' Speeches to Rain, 2005), a poetry book published by the UEA.  Her poetry is included in anthologies and books such as Antologia da Poesia Feminina dos Palop (1998), Antologia do Mar na Poesia Africana de Língua Portuguesa do Século XX (2000), and Antologia O Amor tem Asas de Ouro.  Da Lomba is a member of the Angolan Writers Union (União dos Escritores Angolanos; UEA).

In addition to her published poems and articles, Da Lomba has recorded CDs of Angolan music.

National notability
Da Lomba served as Secretary of the Missão Internacionalista Angolana.  She was awarded the Medalha da Ordem do Vulcão (Order of Vulcan) by the president of Cape Verde in 2005, and is the only non-Cape Verdean to have been awarded this honor to date.

Selected works
 Ânsia, Poesia (1995), UEA
 Sacrossanto Refúgio (1996), Edipress
 Espigas do Sahel (2004), Kilomlombe Publishers
 Noites Ditas à Chuva (2005), UEA
 Sinal de Mãe nas Estrelas (2007), Zian Editora (Publishers)
 Aos Teus Pés Quanto Baloiça o Vento (2008), Zian
 Cacimbo 2000 (2000), Patrick Houdin-Alliance Française de Luanda
 Nsinga - O Mar no Signo do Laço (2012), Mayamba
 Uma mulher ao relento (2011), Nandyala Publishers

CD
Verso Prece e Canto (2008), N’Gola Música

References

1961 births
Living people
People from Cabinda (city)
20th-century women writers
21st-century women writers
20th-century Angolan poets
21st-century Angolan poets
Angolan women journalists